DJ Micro (born Michael Marsicano) is an American trance DJ and producer.

History
DJ Micro began on the East Coast, where in 1991 he helped form the Caffeine Records collective in Deer Park, NY. Caffeine began as a weekly club night, and Micro spun at many of Caffeine's parties, specializing in acid breaks. In 1994 he joined with Vicious Vic under the name Progression. They released a debut single Reach Further, and were later commissioned to remix the artists Paradise 3001, Joe T. Vanelli, Masters at Work, and The X-Files theme.

He recorded two mix albums for Roadrunner in the late 1990s, Coast to Coast (1997) and Caffeine: The Natural Stimulant (1998). Micro's first release for Moonshine Music, Micro-Tech Mix (1998), was followed by a succession of mix albums, usually one released annually, including Tech-Mix-Live in 2001.

DJ Micro toured the U.S. recording mix albums for Moonshine Music, slightly changing his style with each album, and moved toward trance while maintaining his breakbeat emphasis.

Albums

Coast To Coast (1997)
Caffeine: The DJ Micro Blend (1998)
Micro-Tech-Mix (1998)
Micro-Tech-Mix Version 2.0 (1999)
Tech-Mix 2000 (2000)
djmixed.com/micro (2000)
Micro Tech-Mix Live (2001)
Music Through Me (2002)
My Frequency 001 (2003)
Out Through the Input (2005)
Tech-Mix 5 (2005)
Direct Konnect (2006)
Past Present Future, Vol. 2 (2007)

References

External links
 Official site
 DJ Micro at Discogs

Living people
American house musicians
American trance musicians
American DJs
People from Deer Park, New York
Electronic dance music DJs
Year of birth missing (living people)